This article lists third-party and independent candidates, also jointly known as minor candidates, associated with the 2020 United States presidential election.

"Third party" is a term commonly used in the United States in reference to political parties other than the Democratic and Republican parties. An independent candidate is one not affiliated with any political party.

The list of candidates whose names were printed on the ballot or who were accepted as write-in candidates varied by state. More than a hundred candidates were on the ballot or formally registered as write-in candidates in at least one state.

All minor candidates combined received less than 2% of the national votes.

Summary
Show/hide: [presidential candidates] [vice presidential candidates] [parties] [ballot access]

Candidates who received more than 2,000 votes
The candidates below are listed in order of national vote totals.

Jo Jorgensen, Libertarian Party

Libertarian candidate Jo Jorgensen was the only minor candidate to breach a million votes nationwide, getting more than 1
% of the national votes and more than the margin between the two major candidates, Donald Trump and Joe Biden, in several battleground states. She was also the only minor candidate who was on the ballot in every state.

Howie Hawkins, Green Party

Rocky De La Fuente, Alliance Party

Gloria La Riva, Party for Socialism and Liberation

Kanye West, Birthday Party

Don Blankenship, Constitution Party

Brock Pierce, independent

Brian Carroll, American Solidarity Party

Jade Simmons, independent

Alyson Kennedy, Socialist Workers Party

Bill Hammons, Unity Party

Jerome Segal, Bread and Roses

Dario Hunter, Progressive Party

Phil Collins, Prohibition Party

Jesse Ventura, Green Party of Alaska

Mark Charles, independent

Joe McHugh, independent

Other votes
A few states counted write-in votes for anyone, including people who did not declare themselves candidates and even non-human entities. In Vermont, write-in preferences included well-regarded politicians (including misspellings), celebrities, fictional characters, deities and a type of cheese.

In Nevada, the ballots included the option "none of these candidates", which received 14,079 votes.

Debates

Withdrawn candidates
 Max Abramson, New Hampshire State Representative from the 20th Rockingham district (ran for and lost the Veterans Party of America nomination) (ran for election to the New Hampshire House of Representatives)
 Darcy Richardson, author, historian and political activist (Reform Party) (ran for Vice-President)
 Bernie Sanders, U.S. senator from Vermont (Working Families Party, Oregon Progressive Party, Vermont Progressive Party, and Socialist Alternative) (endorsed Biden)
 Elizabeth Warren, U.S. senator from Massachusetts (Working Families Party) (endorsed Biden)

Declined
Individuals in this section were the subject of speculation that they might run for president as an independent or minor party candidate for the 2020 election but later said that they would not.
 Michael Bloomberg, former Mayor of New York (2002–2013), CEO of Bloomberg (ran for Democratic nomination) (endorsed Biden)
 Mark Cuban, businessman and investor from Texas (endorsed Biden)
 Tulsi Gabbard, U.S. Representative from HI-02 (2013–present) (ran for Democratic nomination) (endorsed Biden)
 John Kasich, former Governor of Ohio (2011–2019) (endorsed Biden)
 Howard Schultz, former CEO of Starbucks from Washington (endorsed Biden)
 Ed Stack, CEO of Dick's Sporting Goods
 Jesse Ventura, former Governor of Minnesota (1999–2003), former mayor of Brooklyn Park (1991–1995) (considered running for the Green Party nomination; along with Cynthia McKinney, replaced Howie Hawkins and Angela Walker as the Green Party candidates on the ballot in Alaska)
 Marianne Williamson, spiritual/self-help author (ran for Democratic nomination) (endorsed Sanders, then Biden)
 Andrew Yang, entrepreneur, tech executive (ran for Democratic nomination) (endorsed Biden)

See also
 2020 Republican Party presidential candidates
 2020 Democratic Party presidential candidates
 Timeline of the 2020 United States presidential election
 2020 United States presidential election

Notes

References

 
2020 presidential candidates